The  was a fleet of the Imperial Japanese Navy established during World War II.

History
The Central Pacific Area Fleet was a short-lived operational headquarters of the Imperial Japanese Navy, established on March 4, 1944. With United States Navy forces having driven the Japanese out of the Marshall Islands and Caroline Islands in late 1943 to early 1944, the remnants of Japanese naval forces from those areas regrouped under the direction of Admiral Chuichi Nagumo. The new Central Pacific Area Fleet was a combined operational command containing air (IJN 14th Air Fleet) and ground (IJA 31st Army) elements, and was tasked with the defense of the Mariana Islands and Palau, from its command center in Saipan.

With the fall of Saipan to American forces on July 8, 1944 and subsequent death of Admiral Nagumo and his staff, the Central Area Fleet ceased to exist.

Transition

Commanders of the IJN Central Pacific Area Fleet
Commander in chief 

Chief of staff

References

Books

External links

Notes

Fleets of the Imperial Japanese Navy
Military units and formations established in 1944
Military units and formations disestablished in 1944